The men's marathon at the 2018 European Athletics Championships took place in the inner districts of Berlin on 12 August.

Records

Schedule

Results

See also
 2018 European Athletics Championships – Men's Marathon Cup

References

Marathon M
Marathons at the European Athletics Championships
European
Marathons in Germany
Men's marathons